Hanscom may refer to:

 Adelaide Hanscom Leeson (1875–1931), an artist and photographer.
 Alfred H. Hanscom (1819 – c. 1880), a Speaker of the Michigan House of Representatives.
 Andrew J. Hanscom (1828–1907), a politician.
 Ben Hanscom, a character in the Steven King novel It.
 Dick Hanscom, a professional golfer.
 Elizabeth Deering Hanscom (1865–1960), American professor of English at Smith College
 Hanscom Smith, a career member of the US Senior Foreign Service.
 Moses C. Hanscom (1842-1873), a Medal of Honor recipient.

See also

 Hanscom Air Force Base
 Hanscom Field
 Hanscom Park
 Hanscom Park United Methodist Church
 Hanscomb